CAG bird is a specially painted aircraft, officially flown by the commanding officer of United States Navy Carrier Air Groups. Every carrier-based aircraft squadron of the United States Navy has such an aircraft that wears modex usually ending with the '00' numbers. Due to their striking, colorful paint schemes, enthusiasts such as modelers and aircraft photographers show great interest in these aircraft.
Similar terms for "CAG Birds" include:

Show Bird
Easter Egg
Boss Machine
Head Nuts
Double Nuts
Triple Nuts (F/A-18B used by VMFA-321 during mid to late 1990s).

Carrier Air Wings
United States naval aviation